Apalachee High School is located in Winder, Georgia, United States. The school's team is known as the Wildcats. Apalachee is a part of Barrow County Schools, a Title I district. Feeder schools include Haymon-Morris Middle School and Westside Middle School.

Notable alumni 
 Kamar Baldwin – basketball player

References

Public high schools in Georgia (U.S. state)
Schools in Barrow County, Georgia
2000 establishments in Georgia (U.S. state)
Educational institutions established in 2000